Ujihara (written: 氏原 or 宇治原) is a Japanese surname. Notable people with the surname include:

, Japanese comedian
, Japanese footballer

Japanese-language surnames